Otto Stellter (22 July 1823 - 21 August 1894) was a German jurist who went into politics, sitting as a member of the national Reichstag (parliament) (FKP) between 1878 and 1881.

Life
Otto Theodor Friedrich Stellter was born at Königsberg in East Prussia.   Between 1840 and 1843 he studied jurisprudence at the city's university and at the Frederick-William University (as the "Humboldt" was then known) in Berlin.  At Königsberg he was a member of the Pappenhemia student fraternity.  He qualified as a lawyer in 1849.  In January 1849 he embarked on a career in Königsberg as a lawyer and notary.

In July 1878 he entered the German Reichstag (parliament), representing the third Königsberg electoral district which covered the central part of the city, and sitting as a member of the conservative National Party ("Deutsche Reichspartei"). As a parliamentarian he sat on several parliamentary commissions.

Otto Stellter died on 21 August 1894 at Neuhäuser, a small town on the coastal strip of land separating the "Frisches Haff" (as the Vistula Lagoon was then known) from the sea.

References

1823 births
1894 deaths
Jurists from Königsberg
People from East Prussia
German Protestants
Free Conservative Party politicians
Members of the 4th Reichstag of the German Empire
Politicians from Königsberg